Fla–Flu (a truncation of Flamengo-Fluminense) is an association football match between cross-town rivals Flamengo and Fluminense. Matches take place in the 78,000-seat Maracanã Stadium, located near downtown Rio de Janeiro, in the city's Maracanã district. The world record football match attendance between clubs is a Fla 0–0 Flu with 194,603 in 1963.

The moniker Fla–Flu was coined by the journalist Mário Filho during the professionalization of Rio de Janeiro's football.

Flamengo is the most successful team in the Carioca Championship. Flamengo has won it 37 times, Fluminense 32. Flamengo has won seven Série A and four Brazilian Cups; Fluminense has won four Série A and one Brazilian Cup. Fluminense has won the Copa Rio, which it claims to be equivalent to a world club tournament. Flamengo has won three Libertadores Cup and one Intercontinental Cup. Fluminense is the only soccer team in the world that holds the IOC's Olympic Cup ("Coupe Olympique" or "Taça Olímpica"), a non-competitive award for distinguished service in upholding the ideals of the Olympic Movement and to recognise the particular merits of institutions or associations and their services rendered to sport, conquered in 1949.

The rivalry between these two clubs began in October 1911, when a group of dissatisfied players from Fluminense left the club, and went to Flamengo, which at the time had no football department. The first Fla–Flu ever was played the following year, on July 7, 1912, at Laranjeiras stadium. Fluminense won this match 3–2, with 800 people in attendance.

The Fla–Flu matches are mentioned in Lamartine Babo's unofficial, but very popular, Flamengo anthem composed in 1942.

Important matches 
On November 23, 1941, Flamengo and Fluminense disputed the Campeonato Carioca final, at Gávea Stadium. As the stadium is located in Lagoa neighborhood, the match was nicknamed Lagoa's Fla-Flu. The first half of the match ended 2–1 to Fluminense. Flamengo's Pirillo scored a goal in the 39th minute of the second half of the match, but Fluminense only needed a draw in the match, and won the competition. 15,312 people watched the match.

In 1991, the Campeonato Carioca final was again disputed between Flamengo and Fluminense. The first leg, played on December 13, ended in a 1–1 draw. In the second leg, played on December 19, Flamengo beat Fluminense 4–2. The Flamengo goals were scored by Uidemar, Gaúcho, Zinho and Júnior. Both Fluminense goals were scored by Ézio. Flamengo's Gaúcho was the top goalscorer of that competition.

In the Campeonato Carioca history, Fluminense beat Flamengo to the title in 1919, 1936, 1941, 1969, 1973, 1983, 1984, 1995 and 2022. Flamengo beat Fluminense in 1963, 1972, 1991, 2017, 2020 and 2021. The Carioca had many formats over the years. However, there is disagreement in the decision criterion on the 1919, 1969 and 1983 championships, won by Fluminense. Discussion that gained strength among Flamengo fans in early 2021, days before the 2021 Carioca Football Championship final, when flamengo had the chance to pass Fluminense with this new criterion.

One of the most famous matches between the two clubs is the 1995 Campeonato Carioca final stage match, played on June 25 of that year at Maracanã stadium. In this match, Fluminense's Renato Gaúcho scored a belly goal, and his team won the match 3–2. Fluminense finished the stage with 33 points, winning the title, and Flamengo finished one point behind its rival, losing the championship in the year of its centenary.

The 2004 Campeonato Carioca had two matches played between Flamengo and Fluminense. On February 1, Flamengo won by 4-3, after Fluminense scored 3-1 in the first half. On February 21, Flamengo defeated Fluminense 3-2, which gave Flamengo the Taça Guanabara title of that year.

Highest Fla-Flu attendances
 Flamengo – Fluminense 0–0, 194,603 (177.656 paid), December 12, 1963
 Flamengo – Fluminense 2–3, 171,599, June 15, 1969
 Flamengo – Fluminense 0–0, 155,116, May 16, 1976
 Flamengo – Fluminense 0–1, 153,520, December 16, 1984
 Flamengo – Fluminense 0–2, 138,599, August 2, 1970
 Flamengo – Fluminense 1–1, 138,557, April 22, 1979
 Flamengo – Fluminense 5–2, 137,002, April 23, 1972
 Flamengo – Fluminense 2–1, 136,829, September 7, 1972
 Flamengo – Fluminense 3–3, 136,606, October 18, 1964
 Flamengo – Fluminense 1–0, 124,432, September 23, 1979

Statistics 

Latest match: Flamengo 1-2 Fluminense (played on September 18, 2022)

Titles comparison

Note (1): The Flamengo considers the Copa União as a Brazilian Championship but, although the Copa União is considered an official title, it is not officially considered a Brazilian Championship. That makes the Flamengo officially have 7 Brazilian Championship. 

Note (2): Although Flamengo and Fluminense considers itself champions of the Rio–São Paulo in 1940 (according to some sources, the other clubs that participated in this competition too considered Flamengo and Fluminense champions of this competition), officially this competition ended without an official champion. Making officially Flamengo have 1 Rio–São Paulo and Fluminense 2 Rio–São Paulo.

References 
 Enciclopédia do Futebol Brasileiro, Volume 1 - Lance, Rio de Janeiro: Aretê Editorial S/A, 2001.

External links 
 FIFA website
 History of the Fla-Flu Rivalry

Brazilian football derbies
CR Flamengo
Fluminense FC